Walter Cooke may refer to:

Walter E. Cooke (1910–1982), American politician from New York
Walter H. Cooke (1838–1909), American soldier and Medal of Honor recipient
Walter Cooke (footballer) (1876–1927), Australian rules footballer

See also
Walter Cook (disambiguation)